The 2014–15 EuroChallenge Quarterfinals were played in a best-of-three Playoffs format. Teams who were group winners in the Top 16 had home court advantage. Play began on 10 March 2015 and ended on 17 March 2015.

Summary
The quarterfinals were played in a best-of-three playoff format. Teams that finished first in their top 16 group played the first and third leg at home. Matchdays were on 10 March, 12 March and 17 March 2015.

|}

Energia Târgu Jiu – Le Mans Sarthe

JSF Nanterre – Enel Brindisi

Fraport Skyliners – Enisey Krasnoyarsk

Trabzonspor Medical Park – Avtodor Saratov

References

Quarterfinals
2014–15 in Romanian basketball
2014–15 in French basketball
2014–15 in Italian basketball
2014–15 in Turkish basketball
2014–15 in German basketball
2014–15 in Russian basketball